Félix Díaz may refer to:

 Félix Díaz (politician) (1868–1945), Mexican revolutionary, nephew of President Porfirio Díaz
 Félix Díaz (baseball) (born 1980), Major League Baseball player
 Félix Díaz (footballer) (born 1927), former footballer
 Manuel Félix Díaz (born 1983), Dominican Olympic boxer
 Félix Díaz (cacique) (born 1959), qarashé of the aboriginal community Potae Napocna Navogoh